Henry E. Holt (27 September 1929 - 5 May 2019) was an American astronomer and prolific discoverer of minor planets and comets, who has worked as a planetary geologist at the United States Geological Survey and Northern Arizona University.

Career 

In the 1960s he studied the photometric properties of the lunar surface as part of the Surveyor and Apollo programs.

Between 1989 and 1993, he has discovered nearly 700 minor planets, and ranks among the Top 30 discoverers in MPC's list. His discoveries including the potentially hazardous asteroid 4581 Asclepius, the numbered asteroid that has made the closest approach to Earth at the time, as well as the near-Earth asteroid 4544 Xanthus, and the main-belt asteroid 6312 Robheinlein, which he named after famous science fiction author, Robert Heinlein. He is also a co-discoverer of the three periodic comets 121P/Shoemaker-Holt, 127P/Holt–Olmstead (discovered with C. Michelle Olmstead), and 128P/Shoemaker-Holt.

Awards and honors 

The Mars-crossing asteroid 4435 Holt was named in his honor. The official naming citation was published by the Minor Planet Center on 30 January 1991.

Minor planet 4582 Hank is named after his son, Henry Reid Holt.

List of discovered minor planets 

Henry Holt made some of his discoveries in collaboration with:  Norman G. Thomas,  David Levy,  Jeffery A. Brown, and Carolyn Shoemaker

See also

References

External links 
 Henry Holt's Obituary
 Archive of Astronomy Questions and Answers
 cometography.com

1929 births
2019 deaths
20th-century American astronomers
Discoverers of asteroids
Discoverers of comets
Northern Arizona University faculty
United States Geological Survey personnel